Gim Eun-ji also known as Gim Un-chi (born January 23, 1990) is a Korean curler from Gyeonggi-do. She currently skips the Gyeonggi Province curling team.

Career
Gim played as lead in her first world championship at the 2011 Capital One World Women's Curling Championship along with skip Kim Ji-sun. The team struggled finishing in last place with a 2–9 record. At the 2012 World Women's Curling Championship, South Korea made history by making the playoffs for the first time with a 8–3 record. They defeated Canada to advance to the semifinal, but lost a close game against eventual champions Switzerland. They then lost another close game to the Canadians in the bronze medal game, finishing in fourth place. Their fourth-place finish ensured them a spot in the 2014 Winter Olympics, even though South Korea did not qualify for the 2013 World Championships. At the Olympics, Gim played in the third and fourth positions, and the Korean team finished in eighth place with a 3–6 record. A month after the Olympics, Gim and her team represented South Korea at the 2014 World Women's Curling Championship in Saint John, New Brunswick. Like in 2012, the team had a successful run finishing round robin play with an 8–3 record and winning the tiebreaker 7–5 over Sweden's Margaretha Sigfridsson to qualify for the playoffs. They defeated Russia's Anna Sidorova in the 3 vs. 4 game but then lost the semifinal to, once again, Switzerland who went on to win the event. Gim missed her final shot of the Bronze medal game and the Russian's stole the win 7–6.

The 2014–15 season was not a good season for the team. They won a World Curling Tour, the Crestwood Ladies Fall Classic but they didn't play in the 2014 Pacific-Asia Curling Championships and South Korea did not qualify for the 2015 World Women's Curling Championship. The 2015–16 season was successful for the team. They won the Hub International Crown of Curling, finished second at the 2015 Pacific-Asia Curling Championships and qualified for the 2016 World Women's Curling Championship. Gim and her team struggled during the World's, finishing in seventh place with an 5–6 record. Gim finished off the season with a third-place finish at the Korean National Championship.

Gim played in a number of events in the 2016–17 season and made the playoffs in a few as well. The team finished second at the inaugural Hokkaido Bank Curling Classic, third at the Hub International Crown of Curling and the Medicine Hat Charity Classic and fifth at the Crestwood Ladies Fall Classic. They also won the Karuizawa International 7–4 over Margaretha Sigfridsson. For the 2017–18 season they didn't play as many events but still found success finishing runner-up at the Prestige Hotels & Resorts Curling Classic to Rachel Homan and qualifying for the quarterfinals at the Colonial Square Ladies Classic, Karuizawa International and the Glynhill Ladies International.

The team had a full schedule for the 2018–19 season with more than ten events and qualifying for the playoffs in five of them. They finished runner-up at the Gord Carroll Curling Classic and even played in the 2018 Tour Challenge Tier 2, losing the quarterfinal game.

In summer 2019, Team Gim would win the 2019 Korean National Women's Curling Championship after stealing two in the tenth end of the final against Kim Min-ji. To start their tour season, her team had a quarterfinal finish at the 2019 Cameron's Brewing Oakville Fall Classic. They followed this by missing the playoffs at the 2019 Stu Sells Oakville Tankard, a semifinal finish at the 2019 AMJ Campbell Shorty Jenkins Classic and winning the 2019 KW Fall Classic posting a perfect 7–0 record en route to capturing the title. At the 2019 Pacific-Asia Curling Championships, Gim and her team had a disappointing finish. After going 6–1 in the round robin, they lost the semi-final to China's Han Yu. This performance meant they didn't qualify Korea for the 2020 World Championship through the Pacific region and would have to play in the World Qualification Event for their spot in the World's. Next Team Gim competed in the 2019 Boundary Ford Curling Classic where they lost in the final to Kim Min-ji. Two weeks later, they played in the Jim Sullivan Curling Classic in Saint John, New Brunswick, the same city where the team had success in 2014 at the World's. It was another successful run for the rink as they went 7–0 through the tournament to capture the title. Gim's rink went undefeated at the World Qualification Event, going 7–0 in the round robin and defeating Italy in the 1 vs. 2 playoff game to qualify South Korea for the World Championship. The team was set to represent South Korea at the 2020 World Women's Curling Championship before the event got cancelled due to the COVID-19 pandemic. The World Qualification Event would be their last event of the season as the remaining two events (the Players' Championship and the Champions Cup Grand Slam events) were also cancelled due to the pandemic.

Team Gim was not able to defend their national title at the 2020 Korean Women's Curling Championship in November 2020. After going 4–2 through the round robin, they defeated Um Min-ji 8–6 in the 3 vs. 4 game and then beat Kim Min-ji 9–4 in the semifinal. They then lost in the final to the undefeated Team Kim Eun-jung, meaning Team Kim won the right to represent Korea at the 2021 World Women's Curling Championship.

The 2021–22 season began in June for Team Gim as they competed in the 2021 Korean Curling Championships to decide who would get the chance to represent Korea at the 2022 Winter Olympics in Beijing, China. In the first of three rounds, the team went 3–1 in the round robin and then defeated the Kim Min-ji rink in the semifinal. They then lost to Kim Eun-jung in the final game. In the second round, they went 3–3, however, because Team Kim Eun-jung won both the first and second rounds, they became the national champions. Gim later competed in the 2021 Korean Mixed Doubles Curling Championship with partner Jeong Yeong-seok, however, failed to qualify for the playoff round. On tour, Team Gim won three events at the Chairman's Cup, the Boundary Ford Curling Classic, and the Ladies Alberta Open. They also reached the quarterfinal round of the 2021 Curlers Corner Autumn Gold Curling Classic and the final of the Red Deer Curling Classic where they lost to Satsuki Fujisawa. Team Gim also competed in all four Grand Slam events of the season, however, finished winless at the first three. In March 2022, Kim Min-ji moved to Gyeonggi Province to join Team Gim at third. The team competed in two Grand Slams at the end of the year, the 2022 Players' Championship and the 2022 Champions Cup. After missing the playoffs at the Players', the team made it all the way to the final of the Champions Cup where they lost to Kerri Einarson.

Teams

Grand Slam record

Former Grand Slam events

Notes

References

External links

1990 births
Living people
South Korean female curlers
Curlers at the 2014 Winter Olympics
Olympic curlers of South Korea
Universiade medalists in curling
Pacific-Asian curling champions
Universiade silver medalists for South Korea
Universiade bronze medalists for South Korea
Competitors at the 2011 Winter Universiade
Competitors at the 2013 Winter Universiade
Sportspeople from Gyeonggi Province